was a town located in Tone District, Gunma Prefecture, Japan.

On October 1, 2005, Tsukiyono, along with the village of Niiharu (also from Tone District), was merged into the expanded town of Minakami.

Dissolved municipalities of Gunma Prefecture